Stebljevek is a small dispersed settlement next to Šmartno v Tuhinju in the Tuhinj Valley in the Municipality of Kamnik in the Upper Carniola region of Slovenia.

References

External links

Stebljevek on Geopedia

Populated places in the Municipality of Kamnik